The Fourth Hasina cabinet is the current cabinet of Bangladesh headed by Prime Minister of Bangladesh Sheikh Hasina which was formed after the 2018 general election which was held on 30 December 2018. The results of the election were announced on 31 December 2018 and this led to the formation of the 11th assembly in the Jatiya Sangsad. The swearing-in ceremony was arranged in Bangabhaban at Sher-e-Bangla Nagar.

Cabinet members
Political parties

Cabinet ministers

State ministers

Deputy ministers

Shuffles
19 May 2019
 Murad Hasan was appointed as the state minister for information.
 Md. Tajul Islam was appointed as the minister of local government division.
 Mustafa Jabbar was appointed as the minister of post and telecommunication division.
 Zunaid Ahmed Palak was appointed as the state minister of ICT division.
 Swapan Bhattacharjee was appointed as the state minister of the rural development and cooperatives division.

13 July 2019
 Imran Ahmad was promoted as the minister for expatriates’ welfare and overseas employment.
 Fazilatun Nessa Indira was appointed as the state minister for women and children affairs.

14 February 2020
 SM Rezaul Karim was appointed as the minister for fisheries and livestock.
 Ashraf Ali Khan Khasru was appointed as the state minister for social welfare.
 Sharif Ahmed was appointed as the state minister for housing and public works.

18 July 2021
 Shamsul Alam is appointed as the state minister of planning.

See also
 List of Bangladeshi governments

References

Cabinets established in 2019
Sheikh Hasina ministries
Current governments